The 2016 Champions League of Darts, also known as the Unibet Champions League of Darts for sponsorship purposes, was the inaugural staging of the tournament, organised by the Professional Darts Corporation. It took place from 24–25 September 2016 at the Motorpoint Arena Cardiff, Wales. Phil Taylor won, defeating Michael van Gerwen 11–5 in the final.

Format
The eight qualifying entrants were first split into two groups of four, playing each other once in best of 19-legged matches. The top two players in each group then proceeded to a knockout stage of two semi-finals and a final, all best of 21 legs.

Qualifiers
Only the top eight players on the PDC Order of Merit on 12 August 2016 qualified for the tournament; they were:
  Michael van Gerwen (runner-up)
  Gary Anderson (semi-finals)
  Adrian Lewis (group stage)
  Phil Taylor (winner)
  Peter Wright (group stage)
  James Wade (semi-finals)
  Michael Smith (group stage)
  Robert Thornton (group stage)

Prize fund
The prize money was distributed as follows:

Results

Group stage

All matches first-to-10 (best of 19 legs)

NB: P = Played; W = Won; L = Lost; LF = Legs for; LA = Legs against; +/− = Plus/minus record, in relation to legs; Average = 3-dart average; Pts = Points; Q = Qualified for K.O. phase

Group A

24 September

24 September

25 September

Group B

24 September

24 September

25 September

Knockout stage

Broadcasting
In the United Kingdom, the event was televised by the BBC. The first group games were televised on BBC One; and, from the second group games onwards, BBC Two. Jason Mohammad presented coverage with Paul Nicholson, Mark Webster, and Alan Warriner-Little being the analysts. Vassos Alexander, Dan Dawson, Nicholson, and Warriner-Little were the match commentators.

References

Champions League of Darts
Champions League of Darts
Champions League of Darts
Sports competitions in Cardiff
Champions League of Darts